is a Japanese professional footballer who plays as a defensive midfielder for J1 League club Sagan Tosu.

Career
After growing in Kashiwa Reysol youth ranks, Tezuka opted for an abroad experience in New Zealand, where he signed for Onehunga Sports. He then came back to Reysol, finding his first cap only after a year of orientation. He debuted on March 15, 2017 in a J. League Cup match against Shimizu S-Pulse and he even scored the winning-goal for Reysol.

Club statistics
.

References

External links

Profile at Kashiwa Reysol

1996 births
Living people
Association football people from Tochigi Prefecture
Japanese footballers
Japanese expatriate footballers
J1 League players
J2 League players
Kashiwa Reysol players
Yokohama FC players
Sagan  Tosu players
Association football midfielders
Japanese expatriate sportspeople in New Zealand
Expatriate association footballers in New Zealand